The Sweetwater Archeological Site, near Sweetwater, Nebraska, was listed on the National Register of Historic Places in 1974.

It is the site of a prehistoric village, and it was registered for its potential to yield information in the future.

:File:Sweetwater archaeological site (Nebraska) (3).JPG and another Commons file provide some identifying information.

References

External links

Archaeological sites in Nebraska
National Register of Historic Places in Sherman County, Nebraska